Platovo is a rural locality (a selo) and the administrative center of Platovsky Selsoviet, Sovetsky District, Altai Krai, Russia. The population was 691 in 2016. There are 5 streets.

Geography 
Platovo is located on the left bank of the Katun River, 57 km southeast of Sovetskoye (the district's administrative centre) by road. Podgornoye is the nearest rural locality.

References 

Rural localities in Sovetsky District, Altai Krai